William Crosson Feazel (June 10, 1895March 16, 1965) was a short-term United States Senator from Louisiana.

Life and career
Born near Farmerville in Union Parish, he attended the public schools and engaged as an independent oil and natural gas producer.

From 1932 to 1936, Feazel was a member of the Louisiana House of Representatives. On May 18, 1948, he was appointed by Governor Earl Kemp Long as a Democrat to the U. S. Senate to fill the vacancy created by the death of John H. Overton. Feazel served until December 30, 1948. He was not a candidate for election to the vacancy and resumed the oil and gas business in Monroe and Shreveport. His U.S. Senate seat went to his fellow Democrat, Russell B. Long, the son of Huey Pierce Long, Jr., and the nephew of Earl Long. Russell Long first defeated future Governor Robert F. Kennon of Minden in the Democratic primary and then topped the Shreveport oilman Clem S. Clarke, who in 1948 became the first Republican to run for the Senate from Louisiana since implementation in 1914 of the Seventeenth Amendment to the United States Constitution.

In 1960, Feazel was a presidential elector for the successful Kennedy-Johnson ticket, along with Attorney General Jack P.F. Gremillion, Mayor Leon Gary of Houma, and Municipal Judge Edmund Reggie of Crowley in Acadia Parish.

Feazel's daughter, Lallage Feazel (1913–1999), married Shady R. Wall, a banker from West Monroe and a Democratic member of the Louisiana House from 1948 to 1956 and again from 1968 to 1984. Feazel resided in West Monroe and was a member of the First Baptist Church there. The Feazel Chapel, attached to First Baptist, West Monroe, is named in his honor. He died in Shreveport and is interred at Hasley Cemetery in West Monroe.

Bill Dodd, former Louisiana lieutenant governor and education superintendent, describes Feazel as a "kingmaker" of Louisiana politics and "very quiet and laid back in his outward appearance. His expressions seldom changed no matter what the circumstance. But he rewarded his friends and punished his enemies. And after he helped elect a man to high office, he expected that man to do what was right. He did not want to be and was not a power broker. He was independently wealthy and never asked a favor for himself from one he had helped to elect."

Dodd also noted that Earl Long was particularly friendly toward Feazel, whom he appointed to the U.S. Senate vacancy in 1948. However, Huey Long was partial to Feazel's intraparty rival, James A. Noe, also from Monroe, who served briefly as governor in 1936.

References

External links

1895 births
1965 deaths
Democratic Party members of the Louisiana House of Representatives
People from West Monroe, Louisiana
Politicians from Shreveport, Louisiana
People from Farmerville, Louisiana
American energy industry businesspeople
Democratic Party United States senators from Louisiana
Baptists from Louisiana
20th-century American politicians
20th-century Baptists